Julián Álvarez may refer to:

 Julián Álvarez (footballer) (born 2000), Argentine forward for Manchester City
 Julián Álvarez (lawyer) (1788–1843), Argentine and Uruguayan lawyer and politician